Ubuhle Bemvelo is a studio album from Juluka, a South African band led by Johnny Clegg and Sipho Mchunu. It was first released in 1982.

The title means "natural beauty" or "the beauty of nature".

Track listing 
All tracks composed by Johnny Clegg; except where indicated
 Umfazi omdala 3'30
 Dumazile 3'40
 Bazothini 3'55
 Zingane zami 3'30
 Biza 3'40
 Sonqoba 3'35
 Umgane wami 3'50
 Inhliziyo yegwala 4'10
 Soweto 3'40
 Woza Friday 3'40

Total: 36'37

All songs are in isiZulu.

Personnel
 Johnny Clegg - vocals, guitar
 Sipho Mchunu - guitar, percussion, vocals
 Gary Van Zyl - bass guitar, percussion, vocals
 Zola Mtiya - drums, percussion, vocals

External links
Samples on Juluka website
Other samples

Juluka albums
1982 albums